The Jax Air News is published in Jacksonville, Florida for members of the military services and their families. It serves the Naval Air Station in Jacksonville (NAS Jax).

External links
 Jax Air News website with current issues
 Jax Air News historical archives freely and openly available with full searchable text in the Florida Digital Newspaper Library

Newspapers published in Florida
Mass media in Jacksonville, Florida